From Argonavis (stylized as from ARGONAVIS, originally titled Argonavis from BanG Dream! in 2018–2021) is a Japanese multimedia project by Bushiroad. An anime television series by Sanzigen aired from April 10 to July 3, 2020 on the Super Animeism block. A rhythm mobile game by DeNa titled Argonavis from BanG Dream! AAside featuring the main band Argonavis was released in Japan on January 14, 2021.  A compilation anime film titled Gekijōban Argonavis: Ryūsei no Obligato premiered in November 19, 2021, and a new anime film titled Gekijōban Argonavis Axia is set to premiere in March 2023.

In November 2021, it is announced that the project changed its name from Argonavis from BanG Dream! to From Argonavis, meaning the project is now a whole of its own instead a part of BanG Dream!. A new company centered to manage the project, Argonavis Co., Ltd. is also established with Daisuke Hyūga as the public relation manager. Some addition includes fanclub establishment, server termination of rhythm game AAside, and new smartphone game in development.

Concept
From Argonavis' former name was stylistically written in all caps (ARGONAVIS from BanG Dream!) to differentiate the project and band names. Although it was titled Argonavis from BanG Dream!, the BanG Dream! franchise creator Takaaki Kidani stated that there will be no interaction between the girls in the main BanG Dream! universe and the new project as they are in different worlds from the one another. While the Argonavis project was originally planned as an extension of the general BanG Dream! franchise, mixed reception to the appearance of male characters in the original all-female franchise prompted Argonavis to be turned into an independent project in an alternative continuity.

Unlike the original BanG Dream! which is set in Shinjuku, Tokyo, Argonavis from BanG Dream! is set in Hakodate, Hokkaido. Characters of the first band, Argonavis, consists of five first-year university students. They begin their debut with their "0th Live"  was held July 29, 2018. The second "0th live" was held on September 15 following the third live on December 10 of the same year. The lives were held at Shimokitazawa GARDEN. Argonavis' first original song, "Steady Goes!" was distributed for free for those who attended their first "0th" live.

The band's first single  was released on February 20, 2019. Their second single "Starting Over" was released on August 21, 2019.

The band's first live was held on May 17 at Maihama Amphitheater, Chiba Prefecture. The projects announces manga serialization as well as music video for "Goal Line." Their second live titled  will be held on December 5, 2019 at Tokyo Dome City Hall.

On November 5, 2019, Bushiroad announced that the franchise will have both anime series scheduled for Spring 2020, and a rhythm mobile game for early spring 2021 release. The game story takes place after the story in the anime. The franchise also introduced three new bands: εpsilonΦ, Fujin Rizing!, and Fantome Iris. The bands will be featured in the new game along with the Argonavis and Gyroaxia.

Characters

Argonavis
A college students band based in Hakodate, Hokkaido.

Vocalist. A first-year university student who is studying at the Faculty of Law. He could not forget the excitement of the outdoor live he saw as a child, and wished to stand on a big stage one day. However, since he is not good at communicating with other people, he would only sing on his own at karaoke sessions until he was scouted by Yūto, who was looking for vocalist for Argonavis. He is usually a calm person but will get fired up when it comes to music.

Guitarist. A first-year university student who is studying at the Faculty of Literature. Born within a prestigious family in Hakodate, he immersed himself with music activities due to his inferiority complex towards his superior older brothers. He is strong-minded and optimistic, and does not doubt that he will one day become successful with his band and that his family will finally look at him. With his creed "we wouldn't know before we try it," he created Argonavis with enough confidence.

Bassist. A first-year university student who is studying at the Faculty of Literature. His father used to be a seafarer and his mother's whereabouts are unknown. He has always been with his older brother since they were small. He started to become interested in bass because his brother was in a band. He is a prudent character who makes negative remarks to those who try to talk positively. However, he does that to make the band successful.

Keyboardist. A first-year university student who is studying at the Faculty of Political Science and Economics. Being surrounded by study, sports, and music to the point that he could do anything, he is nicknamed "Shindou," (meaning child prodigy) by people around him. Above all, he hoped to be a baseball player, but got hurt before the Koshien and had to give up his baseball career. He doesn't show his real emotions but will respond to people who need him and try his best.

Drummer. A first-year university student who is studying at the Faculty of Business. He wants to make a name for himself and earn money with the band to rebuild his parents' dairy farm that was sunk with debts. From his experience of playing taiko when he was young, he showcased a powerful performance and sold himself to joining Argonavis. He made use of the fact that his drumming is surprisingly powerful from someone his height and stature to be able to join Argonavis. With a thorough pragmatism and a personality that dislikes waste, he is constantly a high tension and a mood maker.

Gyroaxia
A college students band based in Sapporo, Hokkaido.

Vocalist. He leads GYROAXIA due to his powerful vocals and overwhelming charisma. He expects nothing from his band members other than the best. However, if they are not up to his expectations, he won't hesitate to cut them off without warning. He seems to be doing all this to get back at his father, who was a legendary bandman, for abandoning him and his mother. He has no other interests other than music to the point where he initially has a disconnect with his bandmates.

Guitarist. Bewitched by Nayuta Asahi's talent, this leader of GYROAXIA spares no effort in making his name well-known. He is proficient in intel-gathering and uses it to gather information on rival bands, among others. While he adores Nayuta, he doesn't adore him as his own person rather, he adores him as a vocalist. Since he lives in different homes from Wataru Matoba, due to their parents' divorce, he worries about him a lot.

Guitarist. A stubborn man who is also very exceedingly patient. He's the enthusiastic hardworker type who won't stop trying until he excels. While he strongly opposes Nayuta's dictatorial ways, he recognizes the talent in GYROAXIA and strongly believes they deserve to be on top. The only person who has guts to bear his fangs towards Nayuta, but against someone as unpredictable as him, he always holds back from directly confronting him.

Bassist. He committed a crime back on his home planet and was banished to Earth as punishment. His crime was "the inability to make people happy". So he will stay on this planet until he is able to make someone happy... or so he says. He's a rare kind of genius—one able to join GYROAXIA without much of a sweat.

Drummer. He was a kickboxer before switching over to drums to get more popular. Making use of his natural strength, he engraved GYROAXIA's rhythm to anyone who ears with a flashy manner. He's nice to kids and women, looks superficial at first, but he's actually quite stoic. He's among the oldest in GYROAXIA and also admires Nayuta. However, he doesn't get along with Kenta's idea of throwing away his humanity for him.

Fantôme Iris
A visual kei band from Nagoya. They go by stage names during lives. The members are all working adults.

Vocalist.

Guitarist.

Guitarist.

Bassist.

Drummer.

Fujin Rizing
A college students ska band based in Nagasaki.

Vocalist and Saxophonist.

Guitarist.

Bassist.

Trombonist.

Drummer.

Epsilon Phi
A techno pop band from Kyoto composed of middle school and high school students.

Vocalist.

Vocalist and Guitarist. Older twin brother of Kanata Nijo

Bassist. Younger twin brother of Haruka Nijo.

Synthesizer.

Drummer.

Other characters

Owner of the cafe Submariner.

Manager of Gyroaxia.

Music 

An animation music video for "Goal Line" animated by Sanzigen will be some time in 2019. The band's second single, "Starting Over" was used as the theme song in the video game Card Fight!! Vanguard Ex; its coupling song is the ending song of Cardfight!! Vanguard anime adaptation.

Media

Anime 
An anime adaptation for the franchise was announced on November 4, 2019.  The series is animated by Sanzigen and directed by Hiroshi Nishikiori, with Nobuhiro Mōri handling series composition, Hikaru Miyoshi designing the characters, and Ryō Takahashi composing the series' music. It aired from April 10 to July 3, 2020 on the Super Animeism block on MBS, TBS, and other channels.

Episode list

Films 
During the Argonavis AAside New Year Live-Streamed 'NaviZome' Online event on January 9, 2021, it was announced that a new anime film project is in production.  A compilation film titled Gekijōban Argonavis: Ryūsei no Obligato has also been announced and premiered on November 19, 2021. The new anime film project, titled Gekijōban Argonavis Axia, was originally set to premiere in Japanese theaters in Q3 2022, but it was later delayed to November 4, 2022, and then to March 24, 2023.

Mobile game 
A mobile rhythm game developed by DeNa titled Argonavis from BanG Dream AAside (with AA pronounced as Double A) was released on January 14, 2021. The game featured three other bands other than Argonavis and Gyroaxia: Fantôme Iris, Fuuzin Rizing!, and εpsilonΦ. It was initially planned for a late 2020 release before being postponed to spring 2021 to continue development and ensure a better product.

Note list

References

External links

Animeism
Bushiroad
Japanese idol video games
Japanese pop music groups
Japanese rock music groups
Muse Communication
Music in anime and manga
Multimedia works
Sanzigen
Shōnen manga
Shueisha manga